Pelamis can refer to:

 Pelamis platura, a species of sea snake
 Skipjack tuna, Katsuwonus pelamis
 Pelamis Wave Energy Converter, a design to capture wave energy
 Pelamis Wave Power, a company which developed the Pelamis Wave Energy Converter